The 2005–06 Toronto Maple Leafs season was the 89th season of the franchise, 79th season as the Maple Leafs. This season marked the first time since the Maple Leafs joined the Eastern Conference in the 1998–99 season that the team did not make the playoffs.

Off season
Key dates prior to the start of the season:
 The 2005 NHL Entry Draft took place in Ottawa on July 30, 2005.
 The free agency period began on August 1.

Regular season
 October 5, 2005 – The Toronto Maple Leafs and the Ottawa Senators participate in the first NHL shootout. Daniel Alfredson of the Senators scores the first shootout goal in NHL history.
 October 14, 2005 – The Maple Leafs defeat the Atlanta Thrashers 9–1 at Philips Arena, scoring seven power-play goals on 16 opportunities (43.75%).
 December 19, 2005 – Ed Belfour passes Terry Sawchuk for second all-time in wins by a goaltender in a 9–6 Maple Leafs' victory over the New York Islanders. It was the highest-scoring game of 2005–06 regular-season.
 Six members of the Maple Leafs competed in Ice hockey at the 2006 Winter Olympics in Turin. Bryan McCabe represented Canada; Nik Antropov competed for Kazakhstan; Aki Berg competed for Finland; Tomas Kaberle for the Czech Republic; and Mats Sundin and Mikael Tellqvist captured the gold medal while representing Sweden. Sundin also held the distinction of serving as captain for Sweden.
 April 11, 2006 – Captain Mats Sundin scores four goals and adds two assists for six points in a 6–5 overtime win against the Florida Panthers at Air Canada Centre.

The Maple Leafs would go on to lead all 30 teams with most power-play goals scored during the regular season, with 107. Captain Mats Sundin, who scored only 13 goals in his first 49 games of the season, scored 18 goals in his final 21 games, for the 12th 30-goal season of his career. The 32-year-old veteran Eric Lindros, signed by the Maple Leafs on August 11, 2005, had a solid start to the season, scoring seven goals in his first eight games. However, wrist injuries would limit him to 33 games played for the year; he finished with 11 goals and 11 assists for 22 points. Tomas Kaberle, Bryan McCabe and Darcy Tucker would all have career years, finishing with 68, 67 and 61 points, respectively.

Defensively, the Maple Leafs finished 21st out of 30 in goaltending, allowing 263 goals (excluding seven shootout goals allowed). It was the most goals allowed by a Maple Leafs team since the 1996–97 squad allowed 273. Toronto finished 26th in power-play goals allowed, with 99 and 24th in penalty killing, with 80.04%. While goaltender Jean-Sebastien Aubin posted a 9–0–2 record with a .924 save percentage and a 2.22 goals against average (GAA), this was at the end of the season, and it proved too little too late to get the Leafs into the playoffs. Starter Ed Belfour finished with a .892 save percentage and a 3.29 GAA with one shutout, while Mikael Tellqvist posted a save percentage of 3.13, with a GAA of 3.13. Furthermore, for the first time since the 1988–89 season, Belfour did not record a shutout during the regular season.

The Maple Leafs finished the regular season with a 41–33–8 record for 90 points, two points behind the Tampa Bay Lightning, who captured the eighth spot in the Eastern Conference. Their ninth-place finish meant that the Maple Leafs would miss the playoffs for the first time since 1998. Throughout the season, Toronto struggled against their provincial and divisional rivals, the Ottawa Senators, winning only one game out of eight meetings with a 1–5–2 record. Excluding shootout goals, the Maple Leafs were outscored 39 to 19 and were shut-out twice. Goaltender Ed Belfour went 0–5–2 against the Senators with 34 goals allowed, a 5.20 GAA and a save percentage of .834.

Season standings

Schedule and results

|- align="center"
|1||L||October 5, 2005||2–3 SO|| align="left"|  Ottawa Senators (2005–06) ||0–0–1 || 
|- align="center" bgcolor="#FFBBBB"
|2||L||October 8, 2005||4–5 || align="left"|  Montreal Canadiens (2005–06) ||0–1–1 || 
|- align="center"
|3||L||October 10, 2005||5–6 SO|| align="left"| @ Ottawa Senators (2005–06) ||0–1–2 || 
|- align="center" bgcolor="#CCFFCC"
|4||W||October 11, 2005||4–2 || align="left"|  Philadelphia Flyers (2005–06) ||1–1–2 || 
|- align="center" bgcolor="#CCFFCC"
|5||W||October 14, 2005||9–1 || align="left"| @ Atlanta Thrashers (2005–06) ||2–1–2 || 
|- align="center" bgcolor="#CCFFCC"
|6||W||October 15, 2005||3–2 || align="left"| @ Montreal Canadiens (2005–06) ||3–1–2 || 
|- align="center" bgcolor="#CCFFCC"
|7||W||October 20, 2005||5–4 OT|| align="left"|  Carolina Hurricanes (2005–06) ||4–1–2 || 
|- align="center" bgcolor="#FFBBBB"
|8||L||October 22, 2005||2–5 || align="left"|  Philadelphia Flyers (2005–06) ||4–2–2 || 
|- align="center" bgcolor="#CCFFCC"
|9||W||October 24, 2005||5–4 SO|| align="left"|  Boston Bruins (2005–06) ||5–2–2 || 
|- align="center" bgcolor="#FFBBBB"
|10||L||October 27, 2005||1–2 || align="left"| @ Boston Bruins (2005–06) ||5–3–2 || 
|- align="center" bgcolor="#FFBBBB"
|11||L||October 29, 2005||0–8 || align="left"|  Ottawa Senators (2005–06) ||5–4–2 || 
|- align="center" bgcolor="#CCFFCC"
|12||W||October 31, 2005||2–1 || align="left"|  Florida Panthers (2005–06) ||6–4–2 || 
|-

|- align="center" bgcolor="#FFBBBB"
|13||L||November 3, 2005||3–4 || align="left"| @ Carolina Hurricanes (2005–06) ||6–5–2 || 
|- align="center" bgcolor="#CCFFCC"
|14||W||November 5, 2005 †||5–3 || align="left"|  Tampa Bay Lightning (2005–06) ||7–5–2 || 
|- align="center" bgcolor="#FFBBBB"
|15||L||November 6, 2005||4–5 || align="left"| @ Washington Capitals (2005–06) ||7–6–2 || 
|- align="center" bgcolor="#CCFFCC"
|16||W||November 8, 2005||6–4 || align="left"|  Washington Capitals (2005–06) ||8–6–2 || 
|- align="center" bgcolor="#FFBBBB"
|17||L||November 11, 2005||2–5 || align="left"| @ Buffalo Sabres (2005–06) ||8–7–2 || 
|- align="center" bgcolor="#CCFFCC"
|18||W||November 12, 2005||5–4 OT|| align="left"| @ Montreal Canadiens (2005–06) ||9–7–2 || 
|- align="center" bgcolor="#CCFFCC"
|19||W||November 15, 2005||2–1 || align="left"|  New York Rangers (2005–06) ||10–7–2 || 
|- align="center" bgcolor="#CCFFCC"
|20||W||November 17, 2005||4–1 || align="left"| @ Boston Bruins (2005–06) ||11–7–2 || 
|- align="center" bgcolor="#CCFFCC"
|21||W||November 19, 2005||5–1 || align="left"|  Atlanta Thrashers (2005–06) ||12–7–2 || 
|- align="center" bgcolor="#FFBBBB"
|22||L||November 23, 2005||1–5 || align="left"|  Boston Bruins (2005–06) ||12–8–2 || 
|- align="center"
|23||L||November 25, 2005||3–4 SO|| align="left"| @ Carolina Hurricanes (2005–06) ||12–8–3 || 
|- align="center" bgcolor="#CCFFCC"
|24||W||November 26, 2005||4–3 OT|| align="left"|  Montreal Canadiens (2005–06) ||13–8–3 || 
|- align="center" bgcolor="#CCFFCC"
|25||W||November 28, 2005||2–1 || align="left"| @ Florida Panthers (2005–06) ||14–8–3 || 
|- align="center" bgcolor="#FFBBBB"
|26||L||November 30, 2005||1–2 || align="left"| @ Tampa Bay Lightning (2005–06) ||14–9–3 || 
|-

|- align="center" bgcolor="#CCFFCC"
|27||W||December 1, 2005||4–0 || align="left"| @ Atlanta Thrashers (2005–06) ||15–9–3 || 
|- align="center" bgcolor="#FFBBBB"
|28||L||December 3, 2005||4–5 || align="left"|  San Jose Sharks (2005–06) ||15–10–3 || 
|- align="center" bgcolor="#FFBBBB"
|29||L||December 6, 2005||1–2 || align="left"|  Los Angeles Kings (2005–06) ||15–11–3 || 
|- align="center" bgcolor="#FFBBBB"
|30||L||December 10, 2005||1–2 || align="left"|  Dallas Stars (2005–06) ||15–12–3 || 
|- align="center" bgcolor="#CCFFCC"
|31||W||December 12, 2005||3–2 || align="left"|  Mighty Ducks of Anaheim (2005–06) ||16–12–3 || 
|- align="center" bgcolor="#FFBBBB"
|32||L||December 17, 2005||2–8 || align="left"| @ Ottawa Senators (2005–06) ||16–13–3 || 
|- align="center" bgcolor="#CCFFCC"
|33||W||December 19, 2005||9–6 || align="left"|  New York Islanders (2005–06) ||17–13–3 || 
|- align="center" bgcolor="#FFBBBB"
|34||L||December 22, 2005||1–4 || align="left"| @ Boston Bruins (2005–06) ||17–14–3 || 
|- align="center" bgcolor="#CCFFCC"
|35||W||December 23, 2005||2–1 || align="left"|  Boston Bruins (2005–06) ||18–14–3 || 
|- align="center" bgcolor="#CCFFCC"
|36||W||December 26, 2005||2–1 || align="left"|  New Jersey Devils (2005–06) ||19–14–3 || 
|- align="center" bgcolor="#CCFFCC"
|37||W||December 27, 2005||3–2 OT|| align="left"| @ Pittsburgh Penguins (2005–06) ||20–14–3 || 
|- align="center" bgcolor="#CCFFCC"
|38||W||December 29, 2005||4–3 SO|| align="left"|  Buffalo Sabres (2005–06) ||21–14–3 || 
|- align="center" bgcolor="#CCFFCC"
|39||W||December 31, 2005||6–3 || align="left"| @ New Jersey Devils (2005–06) ||22–14–3 || 
|-

|- align="center" bgcolor="#CCFFCC"
|40||W||January 2, 2006||3–2 OT|| align="left"|  Pittsburgh Penguins (2005–06) ||23–14–3 || 
|- align="center" bgcolor="#FFBBBB"
|41||L||January 6, 2006||0–1 || align="left"| @ Calgary Flames (2005–06) ||23–15–3 || 
|- align="center" bgcolor="#CCFFCC"
|42||W||January 7, 2006||3–2 || align="left"| @ Edmonton Oilers (2005–06) ||24–15–3 || 
|- align="center" bgcolor="#FFBBBB"
|43||L||January 10, 2006||3–4 || align="left"| @ Vancouver Canucks (2005–06) ||24–16–3 || 
|- align="center" bgcolor="#FFBBBB"
|44||L||January 14, 2006||3–4 || align="left"|  Phoenix Coyotes (2005–06) ||24–17–3 || 
|- align="center" bgcolor="#FFBBBB"
|45||L||January 17, 2006||3–5 || align="left"| @ Colorado Avalanche (2005–06) ||24–18–3 || 
|- align="center" bgcolor="#FFBBBB"
|46||L||January 18, 2006||3–5 || align="left"| @ Minnesota Wild (2005–06) ||24–19–3 || 
|- align="center" bgcolor="#FFBBBB"
|47||L||January 21, 2006||0–7 || align="left"| @ Ottawa Senators (2005–06) ||24–20–3 || 
|- align="center" bgcolor="#FFBBBB"
|48||L||January 23, 2006||3–4 || align="left"| @ Ottawa Senators (2005–06) ||24–21–3 || 
|- align="center" bgcolor="#FFBBBB"
|49||L||January 26, 2006||4–8 || align="left"|  Buffalo Sabres (2005–06) ||24–22–3 || 
|- align="center"
|50||L||January 28, 2006||3–4 OT|| align="left"|  Montreal Canadiens (2005–06) ||24–22–4 || 
|- align="center" bgcolor="#CCFFCC"
|51||W||January 30, 2006||4–2 || align="left"| @ Florida Panthers (2005–06) ||25–22–4 || 
|- align="center"
|52||L||January 31, 2006||2–3 SO|| align="left"| @ Tampa Bay Lightning (2005–06) ||25–22–5 || 
|-

|- align="center" bgcolor="#FFBBBB"
|53||L||February 3, 2006||1–4 || align="left"| @ Washington Capitals (2005–06) ||25–23–5 || 
|- align="center" bgcolor="#CCFFCC"
|54||W||February 4, 2006||4–2 || align="left"|  New Jersey Devils (2005–06) ||26–23–5 || 
|- align="center" bgcolor="#CCFFCC"
|55||W||February 7, 2006||4–1 || align="left"|  Atlanta Thrashers (2005–06) ||27–23–5 || 
|- align="center" bgcolor="#FFBBBB"
|56||L||February 10, 2006||2–4 || align="left"| @ New York Rangers (2005–06) ||27–24–5 || 
|- align="center" bgcolor="#FFBBBB"
|57||L||February 11, 2006||2–4 || align="left"|  New York Rangers (2005–06) ||27–25–5 || 
|- align="center" bgcolor="#FFBBBB"
|58||L||February 28, 2006||3–5 || align="left"|  Washington Capitals (2005–06) ||27–26–5 || 
|-

|- align="center" bgcolor="#FFBBBB"
|59||L||March 3, 2006||2–6 || align="left"| @ Buffalo Sabres (2005–06) ||27–27–5 || 
|- align="center" bgcolor="#FFBBBB"
|60||L||March 4, 2006||2–4 || align="left"|  Ottawa Senators (2005–06) ||27–28–5 || 
|- align="center" bgcolor="#CCFFCC"
|61||W||March 7, 2006||5–3 || align="left"|  Montreal Canadiens (2005–06) ||28–28–5 || 
|- align="center"
|62||L||March 10, 2006||1–2 SO|| align="left"| @ New York Islanders (2005–06) ||28–28–6 || 
|- align="center" bgcolor="#CCFFCC"
|63||W||March 11, 2006||5–1 || align="left"|  Tampa Bay Lightning (2005–06) ||29–28–6 || 
|- align="center" bgcolor="#CCFFCC"
|64||W||March 14, 2006||5–4 SO|| align="left"|  Boston Bruins (2005–06) ||30–28–6 || 
|- align="center" bgcolor="#FFBBBB"
|65||L||March 16, 2006||1–3 || align="left"| @ Buffalo Sabres (2005–06) ||30–29–6 || 
|- align="center" bgcolor="#FFBBBB"
|66||L||March 18, 2006||2–5 || align="left"| @ New York Rangers (2005–06) ||30–30–6 || 
|- align="center" bgcolor="#CCFFCC"
|67||W||March 19, 2006||1–0 || align="left"| @ Pittsburgh Penguins (2005–06) ||31–30–6 || 
|- align="center" bgcolor="#CCFFCC"
|68||W||March 21, 2006||3–2 || align="left"|  Carolina Hurricanes (2005–06) ||32–30–6 || 
|- align="center" bgcolor="#FFBBBB"
|69||L||March 23, 2006||1–5 || align="left"| @ Montreal Canadiens (2005–06) ||32–31–6 || 
|- align="center" bgcolor="#FFBBBB"
|70||L||March 25, 2006||2–6 || align="left"| @ Montreal Canadiens (2005–06) ||32–32–6 || 
|- align="center" bgcolor="#CCFFCC"
|71||W||March 26, 2006||4–3 || align="left"| @ New Jersey Devils (2005–06) ||33–32–6 || 
|- align="center" bgcolor="#CCFFCC"
|72||W||March 28, 2006||3–2 || align="left"| @ Philadelphia Flyers (2005–06) ||34–32–6 || 
|-

|- align="center" bgcolor="#CCFFCC"
|73||W||April 1, 2006||7–0 || align="left"|  Buffalo Sabres (2005–06) ||35–32–6 || 
|- align="center"
|74||L||April 3, 2006||2–3 SO|| align="left"|  Buffalo Sabres (2005–06) ||35–32–7 || 
|- align="center" bgcolor="#CCFFCC"
|75||W||April 5, 2006||3–2 || align="left"|  New York Islanders (2005–06) ||36–32–7 || 
|- align="center"
|76||L||April 6, 2006||2–3 SO|| align="left"| @ Boston Bruins (2005–06) ||36–32–8 || 
|- align="center" bgcolor="#CCFFCC"
|77||W||April 8, 2006||5–2 || align="left"| @ Philadelphia Flyers (2005–06) ||37–32–8 || 
|- align="center" bgcolor="#CCFFCC"
|78||W||April 11, 2006||6–5 OT|| align="left"|  Florida Panthers (2005–06) ||38–32–8 || 
|- align="center" bgcolor="#CCFFCC"
|79||W||April 13, 2006||4–3 OT|| align="left"| @ New York Islanders (2005–06) ||39–32–8 || 
|- align="center" bgcolor="#CCFFCC"
|80||W||April 15, 2006||5–1 || align="left"|  Ottawa Senators (2005–06) ||40–32–8 || 
|- align="center" bgcolor="#FFBBBB"
|81||L||April 16, 2006||0–6 || align="left"| @ Buffalo Sabres (2005–06) ||40–33–8 || 
|- align="center" bgcolor="#CCFFCC"
|82||W||April 18, 2006||5–3 || align="left"|  Pittsburgh Penguins (2005–06) ||41–33–8 || 
|-

|-
| Legend:

 † Hockey Hall of Fame Game

Player statistics

Scoring
 Position abbreviations: C = Centre; D = Defence; G = Goaltender; LW = Left Wing; RW = Right Wing
  = Joined team via a transaction (e.g., trade, waivers, signing) during the season. Stats reflect time with the Maple Leafs only.
  = Left team via a transaction (e.g., trade, waivers, release) during the season. Stats reflect time with the Maple Leafs only.

Goaltending

Awards and records

Awards

Records

Milestones

 Jason Allison, Fifth Time in Career, 40 Assists in a Season
 Bryan McCabe, Highest Season Point Total in Career
 Mats Sundin, Fourth Consecutive Season, 30 Goals or More

Transactions
The Maple Leafs were involved in the following transactions from February 17, 2005, the day after the 2004–05 NHL season was officially cancelled, through June 19, 2006, the day of the deciding game of the 2006 Stanley Cup Finals.

Trades

Players acquired

Players lost

Signings

Draft picks
The 2005 NHL Entry Draft was the 43rd NHL Entry Draft. As a lockout cancelled the 2004–05 NHL season, the draft order was determined by lottery on July 22, 2005. Teams were assigned 1 to 3 balls based on their playoff appearances and first overall draft picks from the past three years. According to the draft order, the selection worked its way up to 30 as usual; then instead of repeating the order as in past years, the draft "snaked" back down to the team with the first pick. Therefore, the team with the first pick overall would not pick again until the 60th pick. The team with the 30th pick would also get the 31st pick. The draft was only seven rounds in length, compared to nine rounds in years past. The labor dispute caused the shortened draft.
 Toronto's picks at the 2005 NHL Entry Draft in Ottawa, Ontario.

Farm teams

American Hockey League 
 The Maple Leafs farm club was the Toronto Marlies. In their first season, the Marlies had 41 wins, 29 losses, and posted 92 points for the season. The club finished in fourth place in the North Division. In the playoffs, the Marlies lost in the first round 4 games to 1 to Grand Rapids. Marc Moro was the team captain and Paul Maurice was the head coach.

The Maple Leafs were also affiliated with the Pensacola Ice Pilots of the ECHL.

See also
 2005–06 NHL season

Notes

References

Toronto Maple Leafs season, 2005-06
Toronto Maple Leafs seasons
Toronto